Hsien Feng-lien is a Taiwanese taekwondo practitioner. She won a silver medal in lightweight at the 1987 World Taekwondo Championships. She won a bronze medal at the 1990, and a silver medal at the 1992 Asian Taekwondo Championships.

References

External links

Year of birth missing (living people)
Living people
Taiwanese female taekwondo practitioners
World Taekwondo Championships medalists
Asian Taekwondo Championships medalists
20th-century Taiwanese women